Tshimpumpu Airport  is an airport serving the town of Tshimpumpu in Kasaï Province, Democratic Republic of the Congo. The runway is on the north side of town, west of the N20 highway.

See also

 List of airports in the Democratic Republic of the Congo

References

External links

Airports in Kasaï Province